The 2012 Primera B de Chile season was the 62nd completed season of the Primera B de Chile.

Torneo Apertura

San Marcos de Arica was tournament’s champion.

Torneo Clausura

San Marcos de Arica was tournament’s champion.

References

External links
 RSSSF 2012

Primera B de Chile seasons
Primera B